The 1976 Zagreb mid-air collision took place on 10 September 1976, when British Airways Flight 476, a Hawker Siddeley Trident en route from London to Istanbul, collided mid-air with Inex-Adria Aviopromet Flight 550, a Douglas DC-9 en route from Split, SFR Yugoslavia, to Cologne, West Germany, near Zagreb in modern-day Croatia. The collision was the result of a procedural error on the part of air traffic controllers in Zagreb.

All 176 people aboard the two aircraft were killed, making it the world's deadliest mid-air collision at the time. It remains the deadliest aviation accident in Yugoslav and Croatian history.

Flights 
British Airways Flight 476 departed London Heathrow Airport for Istanbul Atatürk Airport at 08:32 UTC as flight BA476, with fifty-four passengers on board and a crew of nine. At the controls of the Hawker Siddeley Trident was an experienced captain, Dennis Tann (born 1932), who by the time of the accident had accumulated 10,781 flying hours. He was assisted by First Officer Brian Helm and Flight Engineer Martin Flint.

Inex-Adria Flight 550 departed Split Airport at 09:48 UTC bound for Cologne Bonn Airport as flight JP550. It carried 108 passengers, mostly German holiday-makers returning home at the end of a holiday on the Dalmatian coast and a crew of five. At the controls sat Captain Jože Krumpak (born 1925), an experienced pilot with 10,157 flying hours, and First Officer Dušan Ivanuš. Inex-Adria was a charter airline based in the Socialist Republic of Slovenia, the northernmost of the constituent republics making up SFR Yugoslavia.

Both flights proceeded uneventfully until they approached the Zagreb VOR.

Air traffic control 
In the mid-1970s, the Zagreb air traffic control region was one of the busiest in Europe despite being seriously undermanned and poorly equipped. The Zagreb VOR was a reporting point for a number of congested airways between northern Europe and southeastern Europe, the Middle East, and beyond.

Accident 

The controller responded by instructing them to select transponder code 2312, and to call again on reaching the VOR:

This was the last communication with the Trident aircraft before the accident, and the flight was uneventful until the very moment of the collision.

At around the same time, JP550 contacted middle-sector controller Bojan Erjavec asking for a higher flight level; the aircraft was at flight level 260 (approximately ). FL280 and FL310 were unavailable, so Erjavec informed JP550 of the situation and offered flight level 350 (approximately ), which the pilots accepted. To get clearance for a higher level, it was necessary to obtain the permission of the upper-sector controller. Erjavec waved his hand to get Tasić's attention, but Tasić (who was working the upper sector on his own, as co-worker Mladen Hochberger had gone to search for Nenad Tepeš, Tasić's replacement who was running late) was far too busy to be interrupted. Middle sector controller Gradimir Pelin was then instructed to co-ordinate the climbout for the DC-9 with Tasić.

According to Pelin, he walked to the upper sector console holding JP550's flight progress strip. He asked Tasić if the DC-9 could climb to FL350. Tasić took the strip from Pelin and looked at it, then asked where the aircraft was at the moment. Pelin then pointed to a blip on the screen approaching Kostajnica. Tasić's response was 'yes, it could climb'. Pelin then noticed an aircraft on the screen coming from the direction of Metlika and asked Tasić about it, who said 'wait until they cross'. Pelin referred to the middle-sector screen to make sure that he had identified the DC-9 positively on the upper-sector screen. He then returned to Tasić and they both watched the targets pass each other, at which point Tasić authorised JP550 to climb. Pelin then called out to Erjavec and said 'yes, climb it'. Upon Erjavec receiving the OK from Pelin, he instructed the DC-9 to climb to FL350. That was at 10:07:40.

At 10:12:03, JP550 called the Zagreb middle-sector controller to inform them that the aircraft was out of flight level 310. The last instructions given by Erjavec to JP550 were to call the upper-sector controller on 134.45 MHz and to stop squawking the assigned squawk code. By instructing JP550 to squawk Standby, Erjavec simply released a code allocated for the middle sector. The data tag for the DC-9 would now disappear from his screen and the aircraft would become merely a point among many others. If everything about this handover had been normal, the DC-9 would have been given a new code on initial contact with the upper sector controller and would have been positively identified on the upper sector screen with its flight number and altitude readout. But this had not been a normal handover because of the ill-handled co-ordination for the climb. Also, Tasić was busy with other traffic and JP550 did not immediately contact the upper-sector controller. This could have been because the frequency was busy, but the pilots might also have delayed the call for some unknown reason.

By the time JP550 contacted the upper-sector controller at 10:14:04 it had reached the Zagreb VOR and was already climbing through flight level 325 (approximately ). The controller immediately asked for confirmation of the aircraft's level:

 

Realising the imminent danger of collision, Tasić instructed the JP550 to stop climbing. In doing so, he reverted to his native Serbo-Croatian language, contrary to the regulations. This meant that the British Airways plane, even if they overheard this conversation, would have very little chance of understanding their own imminent danger. The controller's last-ditch attempt to avert catastrophe turned what would have been a near miss into the collision he was trying to prevent. For, by the time JP550 had levelled off it was at flight level 330 (approximately ), exactly the same level as BA476:

The mid-air collision occurred at 10:14:41. Half a minute later, Tasić attempted to call BA476 and instruct it to report passing the next waypoint at Našice, but was answered by a different flight:

Tasić continued to call BA476 and JP550, ignoring calls from other aircraft, but to no avail:

Meanwhile, a Lufthansa Boeing 737 was travelling eastbound on UB5 at flight level 290 (approximately ) towards Zagreb, only  behind the Trident.  The co-pilot saw the collision as a flash of lightning and afterwards, out of a ball of smoke, two aircraft falling towards the ground. The Lufthansa captain, Josef Kröse, reported the sighting to Erjavec, the middle-sector controller.

This was spoken in such an agitated voice that Erjavec was unable to understand what was being said. (Later, on hearing the recording of this call, Captain Kröse had difficulty in understanding his own words.) The Lufthansa captain had to repeat his message several times.

When the implications of what was being said dawned on Erjavec, he glanced across to the upper-sector controller. At his station sat a stunned Tasić, white-faced with shock. Slowly he lifted the headset from his ears and placed it on the console in front of him.

The two aircraft had collided over the town of Vrbovec, northeast of Zagreb, the last five metres of the DC-9's left wing cutting through the Trident's cockpit section and forward passenger compartment.

Pilots of the Trident were killed at the moment of collision. The explosive decompression caused the forward part of the Trident's fuselage to disintegrate; the Trident fell, landing on its tail and sliding a short distance before its remains came to rest near village Gaj.  

The DC-9, now without over one-third of its left wing, went into an immediate nose-dive and slammed into the ground right-wing first, near village Dvorišće, 25 seconds after the collision. CVR had reactivated at the moment of collision, having stopped recording 20 minutes earlier.

In the end, everyone aboard both flights were killed.

Initial survivors 

A police officer who was one of the first to arrive at the scene reported that a baby on the ground was "still giving feeble signs of life near the [British] plane, but even if the ambulances had arrived before me, it would have been too late to save it." Locals reported finding a boy, who was lying on a road near a field, and who displayed signs of life up to 15 minutes after the collision, but he eventually died.

Trial 

By noon that day, all controllers were in custody for interrogation. Later, all were released except Tasić, who remained in custody until the trial.

The trial opened on 11 April 1977 in Zagreb District Court. All the controllers were indicted under the Penal Code of Yugoslavia, Articles 271-72 as "persons who by endangering railway, sea or air traffic, threaten the lives of persons or property".

Tasić was the only one to be found guilty; he was sentenced to seven years' imprisonment. After a petition by air traffic controllers, it was determined that Tasić had been used as a scapegoat, and he was released on 29 November 1978. He had served nearly two years and three months in prison.

In popular culture
A dramatised reconstruction of the events leading up to the accident, starring Antony Sher and entitled Collision Course, was made by Granada Television in 1979.

The events of the accident are also documented in a season 1 episode of Aircrash Confidential titled "Collisions", which was first aired on the Discovery Channel in 2011.

See also 
Similar accidents and incidents:
1973 Nantes mid-air collision
2002 Überlingen mid-air collision
2001 Japan Airlines mid-air incident

References 

Cited texts

External links 

 Final accident report 9/82 (Archive) – Yugoslav Federal Committee for Transportation and Communications Second Commission of Inquiry, Published by the Accidents Investigation Branch, Department of Trade
 Annexes (Archive)
 Accident report 5/77 (Archive) Yugoslav Federal Civil Aviation Administration Aircraft Accident Investigation Commission. Published by the Accidents Investigation Branch.
 Annexes (Archive)
 
 Pre-collision photos of Trident G-AWZT taken from Airliners.net
 Pre-collision photo of DC-9 YU-AJR taken from Airliners.net
 Crash site of the mid-air collision from Associated Press Archive

Aviation accidents and incidents caused by air traffic controller error
Aviation accidents and incidents in 1976
Aviation accidents and incidents in Croatia
Adria Airways accidents and incidents
Accidents and incidents involving the McDonnell Douglas DC-9
Accidents and incidents involving the Hawker Siddeley Trident
1970s in Zagreb
1976 in Croatia
Mid-air collisions
Mid-air collisions involving airliners
British Airways accidents and incidents
September 1976 events in Europe